Magnus Bogren (born August 8, 1972) is a Swedish ice hockey coach. He is currently an assistant coach with Rögle BK of the Swedish Hockey League (SHL).

On October 24, 2013, Bogren succeeded Dan Tangnes as head coach of Rögle BK, then of HockeyAllsvenskan.

References

External links

1972 births
Living people
Swedish ice hockey coaches